= Coalmine Creek =

Stream in Oregon, United States

Coordinates: 42°50′46″N 122°41′36″W

Coalmine Creek is a stream in the U.S. state of Oregon. It is a tributary to Sugarpine Creek.

Coalmine Creek was named for coal mining activity in the area.
